The Church of St John the Divine, Bulwell is a parish church in the Church of England.

The church is Grade II listed by the Department for Digital, Culture, Media and Sport as it is a building of special architectural or historic interest.

History

It was constructed between 1884 and 1885 and the architect was William Knight. It is situated on Quarry Road in Bulwell. Quarry Road no longer exists, and the Church is now situated off Keys Close.

Stained glass

There is some stained glass by James Powell and Sons from 1892.

Incumbents
Revd S Bradney
Rev Charles W Whitacre 1935
Rev Charles W Young 1947
Rev Michael Hall 1973
Revd Jeffrey P Fewkes 1981
Revd Christopher Wade 1998
Revd David Gray 2004

Sources

Churches in Nottingham
Bulwell
Church of England church buildings in Nottinghamshire
Bulwell